Gela Zaalishvili (born 19 August 1999) is a Georgian judoka.

He is the gold medallist of the 2021 Judo Grand Slam Tbilisi in the +100 kg category.

References

External links
 
 
 

1999 births
Living people
Male judoka from Georgia (country)